Esteghlal Jonoub Tehran Sport Club, commonly known as Esteghlal Jonoub, isa sports club based in Tehran, Iran. The club is known for their football team. The club was founded in 1990.

History

Establishment
Founded in 1990 by fans of Esteghlal Tehran, Esteghlal Jonoub Tehran SC was officially registered in 2000. Besides football the club also consists of various other departments including athletics, basketball, handball, table tennis, volleyball, taekwondo, weightlifting and wrestling.

League 2
Between 2007 and 2011 Esteghlal Jonoub played in League 2, formerly known as Iran Football's 2nd Division. In 2011 Esteghlal Jonoub were promoted to the Azadegan League. They finished 1st of Group B in 2010–11 Iran Football's 2nd Division. However, in August 2011 the license of the club in the Azadegan League was bought by Esteghlal Khuzestan.

League 3
After Esteghlal Khuzestan bought the license of Esteghlal Jonoub, the club was offset in 2011–12 Iran Football's 3rd Division. They finished 3rd of Group 3 in that season.

Dissolution
on July 19, 2018, the club was sold and named Pesepolis Pakdasht.

Stadium
Esteghlal Jonoub plays their home games at their own Esteghlal Jonoub Stadium which is located in the Shahid Rajaei Street. The stadium has an artificial turf.

Season-by-season
The table below chronicles the achievements of Esteghlal Jonoub in various competitions since 2007.

See also
 2015–16 Iran Football's 3rd Division
 Esteghlal Tehran
 Esteghlal Khuzestan

References

Football clubs in Iran
Association football clubs established in 2001